Rafail Gioukaris (born 27 February 1995) is a Greek professional footballer who plays as a midfielder for Cypriot Second Division club Ayia Napa.

References

1995 births
Living people
Greek footballers
Greece youth international footballers
Super League Greece players
Football League (Greece) players
Cypriot Second Division players
AEL Kalloni F.C. players
Ayia Napa FC players
Trikala F.C. players
Aris Limassol FC players
Association football midfielders
Greek expatriate footballers
Expatriate footballers in Cyprus
Greek expatriate sportspeople in Cyprus
People from Mytilene
Sportspeople from the North Aegean